Arthur Raymond Chung (10 January 1918 – 23 June 2008) was the 1st President of Guyana from 1970 to 1980. He was the first ethnic Chinese (Chinese Caribbean) to be head of state in a non-Asian country. He was honoured with Guyana's highest national honour, the Order of Excellence (O.E.). Chung was a leader in Guyana's fight for independence during the British colonial era.

Early life and career

Chung was born into a Chinese Guyanese family at Windsor Forest at West Coast Demerara in British Guiana; he was the youngest of Joseph and Lucy Chung's eight children. Arthur was educated at Windsor Forest, Blankenburg, and Modern High School. In 1954, he married another native of Windsor Forest, Doreen Pamela Ng-See-Quan, with whom he had one daughter and one son.

Before civic service, Chung was an apprentice surveyor and sworn land surveyor. In the early 1940s, Chung entered the Middle Temple of London, England and qualified as a barrister in 1947. He returned to Guyana and was later appointed an acting magistrate. He became a magistrate in 1954 and a senior magistrate in 1960. Chung also served as Registrar of Deeds and of the Supreme Court. He then became a puisne judge and finally an Appeal Court Judge in 1963.

Presidency
When Guyana became a republic under the leadership of Forbes Burnham in 1970, the Guyanese National Assembly elected Chung President, making him the first President of Guyana; he took office on 17 March 1970. In addition, the powers of President Arthur Chung was the Commander-in-Chief of Guyana's Armed Forces and chancellor of the Orders of Guyana. Ten years later, a constitutional revision transformed the presidency into an executive position, and Burnham succeeded Chung as President on 6 October 1980. During his time as President of Guyana, the office was that of a ceremonial head of state with the powers of the Governor-General of Guyana, while Prime Minister Forbes Burnham was the head of government.

During his presidency, on June 27, 1972, Guyana established formal diplomatic relations with China, making Guyana the first English-speaking Caribbean country to establish diplomatic relations with the People’s Republic of China. In 1977, President Chung of Guyana visited China and met with officials and ambassadors.

Later years

Chung died aged 90 on 23 June 2008 at his home at Bel Air Springs, Georgetown. In the two months prior to his death he had been hospitalized a number of times, and he was last released from the hospital on 20 June.

A week after his death, he was buried at the Seven Ponds in the Botanical Gardens.

Legacy

In 2015, it was announced that the Guyana International Conference Centre (GICC) would be renamed the "Arthur Chung Convention Centre" to commemorate President Arthur Chung, and newly elected President David A. Granger stated: "I would like the first President in this country to be remembered. ... this is the 45th anniversary year of becoming a Republic and Mr Chung was the first person of Chinese descent who was President in a non-Asian country and it was historic." After undergoing rehabilitative work, the Arthur Chung Convention Centre was recommissioned in June 2018.

References

External links

 Article on Arthur Chung in Kaieteur News

1918 births
Guyanese lawyers
Guyanese people of Chinese descent
2008 deaths
Presidents of Guyana
Guyanese politicians of Chinese descent
Overseas Chinese Presidents
20th-century Guyanese judges
Recipients of the Order of Excellence of Guyana
People from Essequibo Islands-West Demerara
Members of the Middle Temple
Burials in Guyana